The Volkspark Hasenheide is a park of around fifty hectares in the Berlin district of Neukölln on the border with Kreuzberg. The name of the park goes back to the use of the area as a rabbit enclosure from 1678. The Great Elector, Frederick William hunted there.

History 
Long before the planning for Hasenheide as a park, there was a cemetery located there. Originating in 1798, it was the first Muslim burial place near Berlin. Turks who died in Berlin were buried there. 

The first Turnplatz, or open-air gymnasium, was opened here by Friederich Ludwig Jahn, in 1811 .  However, the impressive wooden exercise structures were taken down in 1819 because of political turmoil.

In 1904, Hasenheide was transferred from the then Teltow district to Rixdorf. As early as the 1920s, there were plans to turn the area, with its old trees, into a public park. Construction began 1936, only after the monument to the father of the German gymnastics movement, Friederich Ludwig Jahn, was moved to a new location. By 1939, only an eastern section of the park had been completed. In the same year, the city of Berlin purchased around 26 hectares of Hasenheide for 522,987 Marks. 

During the Second World War, there were plans to build a pair of flak towers in Hasenheide. They were meant to be the fourth pair, adding to the existing ones in the Tiergarten, Volkspark Friedrichshain and Volkspark Humboldthain. However, they were never built. 

After the end of the Second World War, 700,000 m3 of rubble were used to create a hill in the western part of Hasenheide called the Rixdorfer Höhe (en: Rixdorf Height). Until around 1950, the US Army used the area as a shooting range.

The area was again planned as a park and opened as such on June 7, 1954. The shooting range was removed and the area was landscaped according to the plans of Neukölln gardening authority, Kurt Pöthig.

Founded in 2009, the park now has a tree nature trail with trees of the year. Each year a new tree is added to expand the trail.

Activities 

Today, the park has an open-air cinema, an animal enclosure, a mini golf course, a rose garden, several playgrounds and a dog park. In the middle of the park is a 1950s-style kiosk called Hasenschänke.

According to the official city website berlin.de, some parts of the park resemble a drug bazaar.

References

External Links
Berlin.de page on Hasenheide
VisitBerlin.de page on Hasenheide

Urban public parks
Parks in Berlin